"Jumping the Gap" is a song recorded by the Australian synthpop band Machinations. It was released in October 1983 and peaked at number 59 on the Australian Kent Music Report.

Track listing
 7" Single (K 9219)
 Side A "Jumping the Gap" - 4:07
 Side B "Terminal Wharf" - 5:28

 12" Single (X 13128)
 Side A1 "Jumping the Gap"  (Extended Version)  - 5:00
 Side B1 "Jumping the Gap"  (Dub Mix)  - 4:10
 Side B2 "Average Inadequacy"  (Club Mix)  - 5:20

Charts

References 

1983 songs
Machinations (band) songs
1983 singles